Pine Banks is a  park located in the cities of Malden and Melrose, Massachusetts. It was donated by former Mayor of Malden Elisha S. Converse to be used "forever as a public park". The agreement was that both towns had equal ownership, responsibility, and power, which is still the case today; the non–profit Board of Trustees owns the park, with equal representation from both cities.

The area was once inhabited by the Massachusett Native American tribe. It was later the home of the Lynde family in the early 18th century, and then became the public park that it is today.

Geography 

The structure of Pine Banks was formed millions of years ago when volcanoes (now inactive) and earthquakes shaped the area. As a result, there are rocky cliffs throughout the park, and even a fault line just south of the park. In addition to that, thousands of years ago, receding glaciers formed an esker which can be seen at the park as an elevated path.

The largest cliff, which is made of solid bedrock, rises 40–50 feet straight up to form Mount Ephraim, which overlooks the whole park. This is the highest point, but not the only point of elevation in the park. There are other, smaller hills and cliffs.

There is a small shallow pond just south of Mount Ephraim that was sometimes called Island Pond but now is usually not named. The pond's banks are fairly marshy, making it a good home for frogs, turtles and snakes. It is highly unlikely that any fish call this pond home.

In addition to the pond, there are other small creeks and wetlands throughout the park. One of these small creeks once connected to the Malden River.

Park facilities 

In addition to being a natural forest area, Pine Banks is also a recreational park. Centered in the park near the pond is a child's playground, containing swings, slides, and other equipment. In the playground there are also two long picnic tables sheltered by a roof. Many birthday parties are celebrated here, but reservations are required.

North of the wooded area there are several fields: One softball field, two full size baseball fields, a quarter mile track with soccer field inside it, and a newly renovated Rugby field. Many sporting events are held at these fields, including soccer games. There are many lights that sufficiently light up the fields for night games. Parking is located in close proximity to the fields.

Pine Banks once contained a golf course, but that is no longer in existence. The course was where the present-day fields are.

There was once a zoo that was home to such animals as goats, donkeys, peacocks, ducks and other assorted animals. The zoo was removed in the early to mid-1990s.

The park also contains an international regulation-size rugby pitch and is home to the Mystic River Rugby Club (Rugby Union), the current 2018 Division 1 USA Rugby Champions.

Gallery

Sources
 City of Melrose – Pine Banks
 A slow walk through Pine Banks... The Melrose Mirror – June 6, 2003

Melrose, Massachusetts
Malden, Massachusetts
Parks in Middlesex County, Massachusetts